Wallace Lloyd Wilson (May 25, 1921 — August 15, 1995) was a Canadian professional ice hockey player who played 53 games in the National Hockey League with the Boston Bruins during the 1947–48 season. The rest of his career, which lasted from 1941 to 1948, was spent in the minor leagues.

Career
Wilson and his parents moved to Oshawa when he was four. He developed his hockey skills in Oshawa and joined the Oshawa Generals for the 1939–1940 season helping lead them to the Memorial Cup Championship. He turned professional with the Hershey Bears of the American Hockey League in 1941-1942 before joining the Royal Canadian Air Force in 1942 and playing for various R.C.A.F. teams the next four years, and joined the Quebec Aces of the Quebec Senior Hockey League to make an Allen Cup appearance in 1944–1945.

In 1945, he was claimed by the Toronto Maple Leafs of the National Hockey League and played for the Pittsburgh Hornets in the AHL for two seasons, leading them in scoring in the 1945–1946 season. He was then traded to the Boston Bruins of the NHL and played there in 1947–1948, before walking away from the second year of his contract to go into the business world (Cliff Mills Motors) back in Oshawa.

Career statistics

Regular season and playoffs

External links
 

1921 births
1995 deaths
Boston Bruins players
Canadian expatriate ice hockey players in the United States
Canadian ice hockey centres
Hershey Bears players
Ice hockey people from Nova Scotia
Ice hockey people from Ontario
Ontario Hockey Association Senior A League (1890–1979) players
Oshawa Generals players
People from Kings County, Nova Scotia
Pittsburgh Hornets players
Quebec Aces (QSHL) players
Royal Canadian Air Force personnel of World War II